Baron Grey may refer to:

 Baron Grey, of Howick, a subsidiary title of the Earl Grey, in the Peerage of the United Kingdom
 Baron Grey of Codnor, a title in the Peerage of England
 Baron Grey, of Groby, a subsidiary title of the Earl of Stamford in the Peerage of England
 Baron Grey of Naunton, an extinct title in the Peerage of the United Kingdom
 Baron Grey de Powis, an extinct title in the Peerage of England
 Baron Grey de Radcliffe, an extinct title in the Peerage of the United Kingdom
 Baron Grey de Rolleston, an extinct title in the Peerage of England
 Baron Grey de Rotherfield, a dormant title in the Peerage of England
 Baron Grey de Ruthyn, an abeyant title in the Peerage of England
 Baron Greystock, an abeyant title in the Peerage of England
 Baron Grey of Warke, an extinct title in the Peerage of England
 Baron Grey de Wilton, an early title of the Earl of Wilton

Grey
Grey